Francis Arthur Knott (11 August 1882 – 24 March 1958) was a British middle-distance running athlete.  He competed in the 1908 Summer Olympics in London. He was born in Haringey, London. In the 1500 metres, Knott placed fourth in his initial semifinal heat and did not advance to the final.

References

Sources
 Francis Knott's profile at Sports Reference.com
 
 
 

1882 births
1958 deaths
Athletes (track and field) at the 1908 Summer Olympics
Olympic athletes of Great Britain
English male middle-distance runners
Athletes from London
People from the London Borough of Haringey